The 1985–1986 season saw manager John Lyall lead West Ham United (known as "The Hammers") to their highest ever league finish, coming a close third behind Liverpool and Everton. They won 26 of their 42 games and finished with 84 points, two behind Everton and four behind eventual double winners Liverpool. The Hammers team of 1985–86 became known as The Boys of 86.

Events of the season

August
The most notable pre-season changes to the West Ham side were midfielder Mark Ward and striker Frank McAvennie, signed from Oldham Athletic and St Mirren respectively.

Both players made their debuts on the opening day of the season in a 1–0 defeat by Birmingham City at St Andrew's. McAvennie played in midfield, but an injury to Paul Goddard gave the Scot the opportunity to establish himself as first choice strike partner to Tony Cottee, who was in his third full season as a regular player despite only being 21.

It was a slow start to the season for the Hammers as they managed just one win from their five games in August, a 3–1 defeat of London rivals Queens Park Rangers in which McAvennie scored his first two goals for the club. He added two more in a 2–2 draw with Liverpool on 31 August. The month ended with West Ham lying 17th in a table led by Manchester United, who had a 100% record.

September
Things got better for the Hammers in September, as they completed the month unbeaten in the league, beating Leicester City 3–0 and Nottingham Forest 4–2 at Upton Park, and drawing at Southampton, Sheffield Wednesday and Manchester City. They began their Milk Cup involvement by winning 3–0 at home to Swansea City in the second round first leg. The Hammers ended September in 13th place.

October
October was another successful month, as the Hammers completed an aggregate win over Swansea in the Milk Cup and also managed league successes over Newcastle United, Aston Villa and Ipswich Town which helped them climb to seventh by the end of the month. Manchester United still led the table, 10 points ahead of nearest challengers Liverpool and 15 ahead of the Hammers. Disappointment came in the Milk Cup on 29 October with a third round exit at Old Trafford.

November
The Hammers muscled in on the title challenge by winning all five of their games in November, bookended by a 2–1 win over defending champions Everton and a 4–0 demolition of relegation-threatened West Bromwich Albion. The Hammers ended the month in third place, a mere five points behind leaders Manchester United, raising hopes that the league title would arrive at the club at long last.

Frank McAvennie was now the Football League's highest scorer with 17 First Division goals.

December
December was a mixed month for West Ham. They managed wins over Queens Park Rangers and Birmingham, but were held to a goalless draw at Luton Town and then beaten 1–0 by Tottenham Hotspur at White Hart Lane on Boxing Day. The Hammers were still third in the league as 1985 drew to a close, level on points with second placed Liverpool and four adrift of a Manchester United side whose title bid appeared to be slowly falling apart after a blistering start to the season.

January
1986 began on a high note for the Hammers, as they eliminated neighbours Charlton Athletic from the FA Cup in the third round before winning 1–0 at Leicester in the league the following weekend. However, their title hopes suffered a blow in the next game on 18 January when they lost 3–1 to Liverpool at Anfield. They now found themselves fifth in the league and seven points behind leaders Manchester United, albeit with a game in hand.

The month ended with a goalless home draw against struggling Ipswich in the FA Cup fourth round.

February
The Hammers' 2–1 win over Manchester United on 2 February proved to be the turning point in the title race, as Ron Atkinson's side were deposed from the top of the table for the first time, allowing Everton go top. The FA Cup replay against Ipswich at Portman Road ended in another draw before West Ham won a second replay 1–0 in extra time. Due to severe weather, however, there was no more action for the Hammers that month.

March
West Ham went head to head with Manchester United in the race for the double as the two met in the FA Cup fifth round. The first match at Upton Park ended in a 1–1 draw, but the Hammers won the replay 2–0 at Old Trafford. However, the double dream died in the quarter-finals three days later when they were beaten 2–1 at Sheffield Wednesday.

The league title dream also appeared to be on the wane when the Hammers lost their next two games, but they ended the month on a high by avenging Sheffield Wednesday 1–0 before demolishing Chelsea 4–0 at Stamford Bridge (making a huge dent to their London rivals' title ambitions) and beating Tottenham 2–1 at Upton Park.

As March ended, the title challenge was firmly back on track – the Hammers were fifth in the league, 10 points adrift of leaders Liverpool but with the advantage of five games in hand.

April
April 1986 was one of the most memorable months in the history of West Ham United Football Club.

It began on a disappointing note with a 2–1 defeat at Nottingham Forest, but the Hammers showed no sign of tiredness and went into overdrive by winning eight of their next nine games, including an 8–1 demolition of Newcastle in which Alvin Martin joined the select group of defenders to score a hat-trick, scoring each goal against a different Newcastle goalkeeper!. They ended the month in third place, four points behind leaders Liverpool but with a game in hand. There was still a chance of title glory.

May
The final Saturday of the league season saw the Hammers win 3–2 at doomed West Bromwich Albion, but on the same day Liverpool sealed the title by winning at Chelsea. West Ham's final match of the season would be a straight shoot-out for second place between them and Everton. The contest was won by Everton, who triumphed 3–1.

Everton's prolific striker Gary Lineker also defeated Frank McAvennie in the contest for the title as First Division leading goalscorer, with Lineker on 30 goals and McAvennie on 26. West Ham had the best home record of all teams in the First Division in the 1985–86 season. Of 21 games they won 17 and lost only two.

There would be no chance of a UEFA Cup challenge the following season, as UEFA voted for the ban on English clubs in European competitions (imposed the previous year in the wake of the Heysel disaster) to continue for a second season. On a more positive note, West Ham held onto their key players for the 1986–87 season, despite a growing trend for the league's top players to move abroad in order to be able to play in European competitions.

League table

Results
West Ham United's score comes first

Football League First Division

FA Cup

League Cup

Squad statistics

References

1985-86
English football clubs 1985–86 season
1985 sports events in London
1986 sports events in London